The 1959 Western Michigan Broncos football team represented Western Michigan University in the Mid-American Conference (MAC) during the 1959 NCAA University Division football season.  In their third season under head coach Merle Schlosser, the Broncos compiled a 4–5 record (3–3 against MAC opponents), finished in fifth place in the MAC, and outscored their opponents, 185 to 116.  The team played its home games at Waldo Stadium in Kalamazoo, Michigan.

Guard Dick Olmsted was the team captain. Offensive guard Clarence Cheatham received the team's most outstanding player award.

Schedule

References

Western Michigan
Western Michigan Broncos football seasons
Western Michigan Broncos football